Edward John Eyre (5 August 181530 November 1901) was an English land explorer of the Australian continent, colonial administrator, and Governor of Jamaica.

Early life
Eyre was born in Whipsnade, Bedfordshire, shortly before his family moved to Hornsea, Yorkshire, where he was christened. His parents were Rev. Anthony William Eyre and Sarah (née Mapleton). After completing grammar school at Louth  and Sedbergh, he moved to Sydney rather than join the army or go to university. He gained experience in the new land by boarding with and forming friendships with prominent gentlemen and became a flock owner when he bought 400 lambs a month before his 18th birthday.

In South Australia

In December 1837, Eyre started droving 1,000 sheep and 600 cattle overland from Monaro, New South Wales, to Adelaide, South Australia. Eyre, with his livestock and eight stockmen, arrived in Adelaide in July 1838. In Adelaide, Eyre sold the livestock for a large profit.

With the money from the sale, Eyre set out to explore the interior of South Australia. In 1839, Eyre went on two separate expeditions: north to the Flinders Ranges and west to beyond Ceduna. The northernmost point of the first expedition was Mount Eyre; it was named by Governor Gawler on 11 July 1839. On the second expedition, he spotted what was later named Lake Torrens.

In 1840, Eyre went on a third expedition, reaching a lake that was later named Lake Eyre, in his honour.

Overland to Albany
Eyre, together with his aboriginal companion Wylie, was the first European to traverse the coastline of the Great Australian Bight and the Nullarbor Plain by land in 1840–1841, on an almost  trip to Albany, Western Australia. He had originally led the expedition with John Baxter and three aboriginal people.

On 29 April 1841, two of the aboriginal people killed Baxter and left with most of the supplies. Eyre and Wylie were only able to survive because they chanced to encounter, at a bay near Esperance, Western Australia, the French whaling ship Mississippi, under the command of an Englishman, Captain Thomas Rossiter, for whom Eyre named the location Rossiter Bay. In 1845 he returned to England on board the Symmetry, leaving Port Adelaide on 16 December 1844, and sailing via Cape Town, under Captain Elder. Upon reaching England, the Symmetry called first at Deal, Kent on 11 May 1845, before anchoring at London on 12 May. He brought with him two aboriginal boys, one of whom was Warrulan.

Once in England, he published a narrative of his travels.

Colonial Governor in New Zealand
From 1848 to 1853, he served as Lieutenant-Governor of New Zealand's New Munster Province (Wellington and the South Island) under Sir George Grey. He married Adelaide Ormond in 1850. She was the sister of the politician John Davies Ormond.

Colonial Governor in Jamaica

From 1854 Eyre was Governor of several Caribbean island colonies, including Saint Vincent and Antigua.

As Governor of Jamaica, Eyre mixed only with the white ruling class, to whose interests he was sympathetic. Instead of trying to relieve the unemployment problems, or the unfair tax burdens on the poorer classes, he busied himself with the passing of bills to provide punishment on the treadmill for certain offences, and flogging as the penalty for stealing food. George William Gordon, a mixed-race member of the Assembly of Jamaica, criticised Eyre's draconian measures, warning that "If we are to be governed by such a Governor much longer, the people will have to fly to arms and become self-governing."

Baptist preacher and rebel leader Paul Bogle encouraged and led a rebellion, and occasioned the death of 18 militia or officials. Fearful of an island wide uprising, Eyre brutally suppressed the Morant Bay rebellion of 1865. Up to 439 black peasants were killed in the reprisals, some 600 flogged and about 1000 houses burnt down. General Luke Smythe O'Connor was directly responsible for those who inflicted excessive punishment.

Eyre also authorised the execution of George William Gordon, a mixed-race colonial member of the Assembly who, though not actually involved in the rebellion, was tried for high treason by Lieutenant Herbert Brand in a court-martial. Gordon was openly critical of the Eyre regime in his capacity as an elected member of the Jamaican Assembly, but Eyre was convinced that Gordon was one of the leaders of the Morant Bay Rebellion. On 23 October, Gordon was hanged two days after his hastily-arranged trial, and Bogle followed him on to the gallows two days later, when he was hanged along with 14 others.

The controlling European element of the Jamaican population—those who had most to lose—regarded Eyre as the hero who had saved Jamaica from disaster. Eyre's influence on the white planters was so strong that he was able to convince the House of Assembly to pass constitutional
reforms that brought the old form of government to an end and allowed Jamaica to become a Crown Colony, with an appointed (rather than an elected) legislature, on the basis that stronger legislative control would ward off another act of rebellion. This move ended the growing influence of the elected free people of colour Eyre distrusted, such as Gordon, Edward Jordon, and Robert Osborn. Before dissolving itself, the legislature passed legislation to deal with the recent emergency, including an Act that sanctioned martial law and – all-importantly for the litigation in Phillips v Eyre – an Act of Indemnity covering all acts done in good faith to suppress the rebellion after the proclamation of martial law.

These events created great controversy in Britain, resulting in demands for Eyre to be arrested and tried for murdering Gordon. John Stuart Mill organised the Jamaica Committee, which demanded his prosecution and included some well-known British liberal intellectuals such as John Bright, Charles Darwin, Frederic Harrison, Thomas Hughes, Thomas Henry Huxley, Herbert Spencer and A. V. Dicey. Other notable members of the committee included Charles Buxton, Edmond Beales, Leslie Stephen, James Fitzjames Stephen, Edward Frankland, Thomas Hill Green, Frederick Chesson, Goldwin Smith, Charles Lyell and Henry Fawcett.

The Governor Eyre Defence and Aid Committee was set up by Thomas Carlyle in September 1866 to argue that Eyre had acted decisively to restore order. The committee secretary was Hamilton Hume, a member of the Royal Geographical Society with whom Eyre had explored in New South Wales. His supporters included John Ruskin, Charles Kingsley, Charles Dickens, Lord Cardigan, Alfred Tennyson and John Tyndall.

Cases against Lieutenant Brand and Brigadier Alexander Nelson were presented to the Central Criminal Court but the grand jury declined to certify either case. Eyre resided in Market Drayton in Shropshire, which was outwith the jurisdiction of the court, so the indictment failed on that count. Barrister James Fitzjames Stephen travelled to Market Drayton but failed to convince the Justices to endorse his case against Eyre. The Jamaica Committee next asked the Attorney-General to certify the criminal information against Eyre but was rebuffed. Eyre then moved to London so that he might bring matters to a head and offer himself up to justice. The magistrate at Bow Street Police Court declined to arrest him, due to the failure of the cases against the soldiers, whereupon the imagined prosecutors applied to the Queen's Bench for a writ of mandamus justified by the Criminal Jurisdiction Act 1802 and succeeded. The Queen's Bench grand jury, upon presentation of the case against Eyre, declined to find a true bill of indictment, and Eyre was freed of criminal pursuit.

The case went next to the civil courts. Alexander Phillips charged Eyre with six counts of assault and false imprisonment, in addition to conversion of Phillips's "goods and chattels", and the case was eventually brought to the UK Court of Exchequer as Phillips v Eyre (1870) LR 6 QB 1, Exchequer Chamber. The case was influential in setting a precedent in English and Australian law over the conflict of laws, and choice of law to be applied in international torts cases. Eyre was exonerated in the Queen's Bench, a writ of error was submitted to the Exchequer, whose judgment affirmed the one below, and an important precedent was thus set by Willes J.

Later life

Eyre's legal expenses were covered by the British government in 1872, and in 1874 he was granted the pension of a retired colonial governor. He lived out the remainder of his life at Walreddon Manor in the parish of Whitchurch near Tavistock, Devon, where he died on 30 November 1901. He is buried in the Whitchurch churchyard.

Recognition and legacy
A statue of Eyre is in Victoria Square in Adelaide as well as Rumbalara Reserve in Springfield NSW on the Mouat Walk. In 1970, an Australia Post (then Postmaster-General's Department) postage stamp bore his portrait.

South Australia's Lake Eyre, Eyre Peninsula, Eyre Creek, Eyre Highway (the main highway from South Australia to Western Australia), Edward John Eyre High School, the Eyre Hotel in Whyalla, and the electoral district of Eyre in Western Australia, are named in his honour. So too are the villages of Eyreton and West Eyreton, and Eyrewell Forest, in Canterbury and the Eyre Mountains and Eyre Creek in Southland, New Zealand.

Eyre Road, Linton, Palmerston North also is thought to be named after him as well as a few streets in Canterbury, New Zealand. Closer to the Monaro, New South Wales, Eyre Street, in Kingston, Australian_Capital_Territory and Eyre Street in Bungendore, New South Wales are named for him.

In 1971, the Australian composer Barry Conyngham wrote the opera Edward John Eyre, using poems by Meredith Oakes and extracts from Eyre's Journals of Expeditions of Discovery.

Works

See also
Mount Remarkable
Water Witch

References

Further reading
 "Eyre, Edward John (1815–1901)", Dictionary of Australian Biography (Angus and Robertson, 1949). 
 "Papers Relative to the Affairs of South Australia—Aborigines", Accounts and Papers 1843, Volume 3 (London: William Clowes and Sons), pp. 267–310.
Geoffrey Dutton (1967), The Hero as Murderer: the life of Edward John Eyre, Australian explorer and Governor of Jamaica 1815–1901. Sydney: Collins ; Melbourne: Cheshire, (paperback reprint: Penguin, 1977).
 Julie Evans (2002), "Re-reading Edward Eyre—Race, resistance and repression in Australia and The Caribbean", Australian Historical Studies, 33: 175–198; .
Catherine Hall (2002), Civilising Subjects: Colony and Metropoloe in the English Imagination, 1830–1867. Chicago: University of Chicago Press.
Ivan Rudolph (2013), Eyre, the forgotten explorer. Sydney: HarperCollins.
Journals of Expeditions of Discovery into Central Australia, and overland from Adelaide to King George's Sound, in the years 1840-41, sent by the Colonists of Australia, with the sanction and support of the Government; including an Account of the Manners and Customs of the Aborigines, and the state of their relations with Europeans. By E. J. Eyre, Resident Magistrate, Murray River. 2 volumes. London (1845). Available at the Internet Archive: Volume I, Volume II.

External links

Short biography
Eyre's Journals from his 1840/1 expedition
 
 
Biography in 1966 Encyclopaedia of New Zealand

Governors-General of New Zealand
Governors of Jamaica
Explorers of Western Australia
Explorers of South Australia
English explorers
1815 births
1901 deaths
English emigrants to colonial Australia
People educated at Sedbergh School
People educated at King Edward VI Grammar School, Louth
Nullarbor Plain
Governors of British Saint Vincent and the Grenadines
Ormond family
Australian stockmen